Yurina Hiraka (born June 4, 1991) is a Japanese long jumper.

She began competing in the event as a teenager and cleared six metres for the first time in 2009. She began to make further improvements in the 2013 season. She also won at the Nanbu Memorial in Sapporo. She had her first national podium finish at the 2013 Japan Championships in Athletics, placing third behind Sachiko Masumi. She jumped  to win the Japanese University title that September.

She gained her first international selection at the 2014 Asian Indoor Athletics Championships and won the gold medal in the long jump.

References

External links

Living people
1991 births
Japanese female long jumpers
21st-century Japanese women